Ram Patil Ratolikar is an Indian politician and belongs to the Bharatiya Janata Party. On 10 July 2018, he was elected unopposed with 10 others to the Maharashtra Legislative Council.

References

Bharatiya Janata Party politicians from Maharashtra
Living people
Year of birth missing (living people)